Vadim Valeryevich Kuleshenko (born 26 June 1966 in Ramon) is a former Russian football player.

References

1966 births
People from Voronezh Oblast
Living people
Soviet footballers
Russian footballers
FC Fakel Voronezh players
Russian Premier League players
Association football forwards
Sportspeople from Voronezh Oblast